239 km is a rural locality (a settlement) in Tarabarinskoye Rural Settlement of Promyshlennovsky District, Russia. The population was 20 as of 2010.

Streets 
There are no streets with titles.

Geography 
239 km is located 18 km west of Promyshlennaya (the district's administrative centre) by road.

References 

Rural localities in Kemerovo Oblast